Milenko Savović (18 July 1960 – 1 March 2021) was a Serbian professional basketball player. For most of his career, he was the captain of KK Partizan.

Savović died from COVID-19 during the COVID-19 pandemic in Serbia.

Career
During his playing career, Savović spent 12 seasons with KK Partizan.

Honours
 Yugoslav Basketball League: 1979, 1981, 1987
 Yugoslav Basketball Cup: 1979, 1989
 FIBA Korać Cup: 1978, 1979, 1989

References

 ACB profile
 Blic.rs Interview from 2012

1960 births
2021 deaths
People from Trebinje
Serbs of Bosnia and Herzegovina
Yugoslav men's basketball players
Serbian men's basketball players
Centers (basketball)
KK Partizan players
KK Vojvodina players
Liga ACB players
Serbian expatriate basketball people in Spain
Deaths from the COVID-19 pandemic in Serbia